Pine Gables, also known as Logan House and Harris Inn, is a historic inn complex and national historic district located near Lake Lure, Rutherford County, North Carolina.  The property encompasses 10 contributing buildings, 5 contributing sites, and 3 contributing structures.  The original log sections of the inn dates to about 1800, and enlarged and modified in 1834, 1877, and 1924.  It is a 2 1/2-story, frame building with high pitched gables in a vernacular Queen Anne style.  Also on the property are the contributing Old Tearoom (c. 1877, c. 1924, c. 1937) now used as a single family dwelling, a one-story stone structure (c. 1877), seven guest cabins (c. 1924-1948), a craft shop (c. 1937), rock wall (c. 1934), three ponds (c. 1949), a segment of Old Highway 20 (c. 1921), and the shoreline of Lake Lure (c. 1927).  Judge George Washington Logan (1815-1889), who also owned the George W. Logan House at Rutherfordton, bought the inn in 1866 and it became known as the "Logan House".  During the Great Depression, the inn and surrounding property was used to promote economic recovery as a Civilian Conservation Corps (CCC) headquarters.

It was added to the National Register of Historic Places in 1999.

References

Civilian Conservation Corps in North Carolina
Hotel buildings on the National Register of Historic Places in North Carolina
Historic districts on the National Register of Historic Places in North Carolina
Queen Anne architecture in North Carolina
Buildings and structures in Rutherford County, North Carolina
National Register of Historic Places in Rutherford County, North Carolina